George Cummins Morphett (1876 - 1963) was an Australian politician. He was a member of the South Australian House of Assembly from 1933 to 1938, representing the electorate of Murray.

Morphett was born in Adelaide, the grandson of Sir John Morphett and son of John Cummins Morphett, clerk of the House of Assembly from 1901 to 1918.

He published a number of works about his grandfather, including "The Life And Letters Of Sir John Morphett" and his grandfather's entry in the Australian Dictionary of Biography. Other works include:

Captain Francis Davison of Blakiston, Adelaide : Pioneers' Association of S.A., 1943
The Bakers of Morialta : Hon. John Baker, M.L.C., J.P., F.R.G.S. and his son Sir Richard Chaffey Baker, K.C.M.G., Q.C., M.A. (Cantab), Adelaide : Pioneers' Association of S.A., 1946 
John Ainsworth Horrocks, Adelaide : Pioneers' Association of S.A., 1946
The Beare Family, Adelaide : Pioneers' Association of South Australia, 1942
Founders of South Australia, Adelaide : Pioneers' Association of S.A., 1944
and numerous others

References

1876 births
1963 deaths
Members of the South Australian House of Assembly
Liberal and Country League politicians